Louis J. Schultz School, originally known as Central High School, is a historic school building located at Cape Girardeau, Missouri, USA. The central section was built in 1915, and is a three-story (plus basement), flat roofed, red brick, concrete framed, Renaissance Revival style school building.  Flanking two-story wings were finished in 1919 and a shop wing added in 1942.  It features a glazed terra cotta cornice and limestone coursing.

It was listed on the National Register of Historic Places in 2008.

References

School buildings on the National Register of Historic Places in Missouri
Renaissance Revival architecture in Missouri
School buildings completed in 1915
Schools in Cape Girardeau County, Missouri
National Register of Historic Places in Cape Girardeau County, Missouri
1915 establishments in Missouri